The 2015 Estonian Football Winter Tournament or the 2015 EJL Jalgpallihalli Turniir was the second edition of the annual tournament in Estonia. Levadia Tallinn were the defending champions. This tournament was divided into two groups of 6 teams.

Groups

Group A

Group B

References
Home page

Winter
Estonian Football Winter Tournament